Alexander Andreyevich Ivanov (July 28 (July 16 [OS]), 1806 – July 15 (July 3 [OS]), 1858) was a Russian painter who adhered to the waning tradition of Neoclassicism but found little sympathy with his contemporaries. He was born and died in St. Petersburg. He has been called the master of one work, for it took 20 years to complete his magnum opus The Appearance of Christ Before the People.

Biography

Early Years and Education 
Alexander Andreyevich was born to an art professor Andrey Ivanov. Aged 11, he entered the Imperial Academy of Arts and studied at his father's course together with Karl Briullov. For his good achievements he was awarded with two silver medals, in 1824 he received a golden medal for the painting 'Priam Asking Achilles to Return Hector's Body'. In 1827 he was honoured with the Big Gold Medal of the Imperial Academy of Arts for 'Joseph interprets the butler's and the baker's dreams' and was promoted to the XIV grade artists.

Ivanov's benefactors decided to send him abroad to study art, but required one more picture, thus he creates 'Bellerophon sent to a campaign against the Chimera'. In 1830 Ivanov departs to Europe, first in Germany, then to Italy.

Italian Years 
Ivanov's first works in Rome were copies of The Creation of Adam of the Sistine Chapel and some drafts of Biblical scenes. He dreamed to create an epic painting of the Messiah coming to people, but first he decided to try himself on lesser scale picture. In 1834-1835 he finished 'Appearance of Jesus Christ to Maria Magdalena'. The painting had great success both in Rome and St Petersburg. The Russian Imperial Academy of Arts granted Ivanov an honorary academic degree in 1836.

He spent most of his life in Rome where he befriended Gogol and was influenced by the Nazarenes.

The Appearance of Christ Before the People 

Ivanov spent 20 years (1837–1857) in Rome, working on his greatest masterpiece 'The Appearance of Christ Before the People'.

Death 
Ivanov died of cholera on July 3, 1858. He was buried in St. Petersburg at the Novodevichy Cemetery. In 1936, he was reburied with the transfer of the monument to the Tikhvin Cemetery of the Alexander Nevsky Lavra.

Influence and Critics 
Critical judgement about Ivanov improved in the following generation. Some of the numerous sketches he had prepared for The Appearance have been recognized as masterpieces in their own right. The most comprehensive collection of his works can be viewed at the Russian Museum in St. Petersburg.

Gallery

References

External links

Online gallery of Ivanov's works
Painting 'Priam Asking Achilles to Return Hector's Body' in The State Tretyakov Gallery

1806 births
1858 deaths
19th-century painters from the Russian Empire
Russian male painters
Neoclassical painters
Russian watercolorists
Painters from Saint Petersburg
Burials in the Protestant Cemetery, Rome
19th-century male artists from the Russian Empire
Imperial Academy of Arts alumni
Awarded with a large gold medal of the Academy of Arts
Members of the Imperial Academy of Arts
Burials at Tikhvin Cemetery
Deaths from cholera